Leandro Melino Gomes (born 24 August 1976 in Casimiro de Abreu known as Leandro Gomes, is a Brazilian-born former Azerbajiani football striker, who is currently the assistant manager of Sampaio Corrêa-RJ.

International
Playing in the Azerbaijani football, he made his national team debut for Azerbaijan against Kazakhstan national football team, 6 September 2006.

Clubs
Past clubs: Itaperuna, Macaé, Sport Recife, Figueirense, Joinville, Casimiro de Abreu, Goytacaz, Americano, Rio de Janeiro (all in Brazil), Naval 1º de Maio (in Portugal).

Azerbaijan Career statistics

Honors
 FC Baku
Azerbaijan Premier League
 Winner: 2005–06
Azerbaijan Cup
 Winner: 2004–05

References

External links
 
 

1976 births
Living people
People from Rio de Janeiro (state)
Naturalized citizens of Azerbaijan
Azerbaijani footballers
Azerbaijan international footballers
Azerbaijani expatriate footballers
Brazilian emigrants to Azerbaijan
Itaperuna Esporte Clube players
Macaé Esporte Futebol Clube players
Sport Club do Recife players
Figueirense FC players
Joinville Esporte Clube players
Casimiro de Abreu Esporte Clube players
Expatriate footballers in Portugal
Associação Naval 1º de Maio players
Goytacaz Futebol Clube players
AZAL PFK players
Americano Futebol Clube players
Azerbaijan Premier League players
Association football forwards